Pasquale Festa Campanile (28 July 1927 – 25 February 1986) was an Italian screenwriter, film director and novelist, best known as a prominent exponent of the commedia all'italiana genre.

Life and career 
Born at Melfi, in the province of Potenza, he moved to Rome at young age. He started as a writer and literary critic. La nonna Sabella, one of his novels, was later adapted by Dino Risi into the movie of the same name, internationally known as Oh! Sabella (1957).

He began his cinema career as a screenwriter with Faddija – La legge della vendetta (1949) by Roberto Bianchi Montero and later co-produced masterpieces of Italian cinema such as Poveri ma belli (1957) by Risi and Rocco and His Brothers (1960) and The Leopard (1963) by Luchino Visconti.

His first film as a director was A Sentimental Attempt (1963), along with Massimo Franciosa. Subsequently he made many films of the commedia all'italiana genre, including La Matriarca (1969), Il merlo maschio (1971), Jus primae noctis (1972) and Conviene far bene l'amore (1975), the latter is based on his novel with the same name.

Pasquale Festa Campanile had a collaboration with Italian singer and actor Adriano Celentano, directing him in films like Rugantino (1973), Qua la mano (1980) and Bingo Bongo (1982). Other notable movies include Soldier of Fortune, a satirical revisiting of the challenge of Barletta; the crime film Hitch-Hike (1977); the LGBT-themed Nessuno è perfetto (1981); Petomaniac (1983), loosely based on French  entertainer Joseph Pujol and A Proper Scandal (1984), inspired by the Bruneri-Canella case which is also his last cinematographic work.

He died of a kidney tumor at Rome in 1986.

Personal life 
Festa Campanile was married to Italian painter Anna Salvatore, from whom he divorced in 1962. Later he was linked to actresses Maria Grazia Spina, Catherine Spaak and Lilli Carati. He married his last wife, Rosalba Mazzamuto, a year prior to his death.

Filmography

Director 
 Un tentativo sentimentale (1953)
 Le voci bianche (1964)
 La costanza della ragione (1965)
 Una Vergine per il Principe (1965)
 Adulterio all'italiana (1966)
 La cintura di castità (1967)
 Il marito è mio e l'ammazzo quando mi pare (1967)
 The Girl and the General (La ragazza e il generale) (1967)
 The Libertine  (La matriarca)  (1968)
 Scacco alla regina (1969)
  (1969)
 Dove vai tutta nuda? (1969)
 When Women Had Tails  (Quando le donne avevano la coda)  (1970)
 Il merlo maschio (1971)
 Quando le donne persero la coda (1971)
 La calandria (1972)
 Jus primae noctis (film) (1972)
 L'emigrante (1973)
 Rugantino (1973)
 La sculacciata (1974)
 Conviene far bene l'amore (1975)
 Tell Me You Do Everything for Me (1976)
 Il soldato di ventura (1976)
 Hitch-Hike (1977)
 Cara sposa (1977)
 Come perdere una moglie e trovare un amante (1978)
 Sabato, domenica e venerdì (1979)
 Il ritorno di Casanova (1979)
 Il corpo della ragassa (1979)
 Gegè Bellavita (1979)
 Il ladrone (1980)
 Qua la mano (1980)
 Nessuno è perfetto (1981)
 Culo e camicia (1981)
 Mano lesta (1981)
 Bingo Bongo (1982)
 La ragazza di Trieste (1982)
 Più bello di così si muore (1982)
 Porca vacca (1982)
 Un povero ricco (1983)
 Il petomane (1983)
 Uno scandalo perbene (1984)

Screenwriter 
 Faddija (1949)
 Un tentativo sentimentale (1953)
 Gli innamorati (1955)
 La donna che venne dal mare (1957)
 La nonna Sabella (1957)
 Poveri ma belli (1957)
 Belle ma povere (1957)
 Il cocco di mamma (1957)
 Vacanze a Ischia (1957)
 Giovani Mariti (1958)
 Ladro lui, ladra lei (1958)
 Totò e Marcellino (1958)
 Tutti innamorati (1958)
 Venezia, la luna e tu (1958)
 Ferdinando I Re di Napoli (1959)
 Il magistrato (1959)
 La cento chilometri (1959)
 Poveri milionari (1959)
 Rocco e i suoi fratelli (1960)
 L'assassino (1961)
 La viaccia (1961)
 La bellezza di Ippolita (1962)
 Le quattro giornate di Napoli (1962)
 Smog (1962)
 Il Gattopardo (1963)
 In Italia si chiama amore (1963)
 Senza sole né luna (1963)
 The Conjugal Bed (Una storia moderna: l'ape regina) (1963)
 Le voci bianche (1964)
 La costanza della ragione (1965)
 Una Vergine per il Principe (1965)
 Adulterio all'italiana (1966)
 The Girl and the General (1967)
 Dove vai tutta nuda? (1969)
 When Women Had Tails (1970)
 Il merlo maschio (1971)
 La calandria (1972)
 Jus primae noctis (film) (1972)
 L'emigrante (1973)
 Rugantino (1973)
 La sculacciata (1974)
 Conviene far bene l'amore (1975)
 Il soldato di ventura (1976)
 Hitch-Hike (1977)
 Gegè Bellavita (1979)
 Qua la mano (1980)
 Un povero ricco (1983)

Bibliography 
 La nonna Sabella (1957)
 Conviene far bene l'amore (1975)
 Il ladrone (1977)
 Il peccato (1980)
 La ragazza di Trieste (1982)
 Per amore, solo per amore (1984)
 La strega innamorata (1985)
 Buon Natale, buon anno (1986)
La felicità è una cosa magnifica (2017)

External links
 

1927 births
1986 deaths
People from Melfi
20th-century Italian novelists
20th-century Italian male writers
20th-century Italian screenwriters
Italian film directors
Giallo film directors
Bancarella Prize winners
Premio Campiello winners
Italian male novelists
Italian male screenwriters
Cannes Film Festival Award for Best Screenplay winners